Galan may refer to:

People
 Galan Erilich, Pictish king of the 5th or 6th century
 Alberto Galán (1901–1977), Spanish-born Mexican film actor
 Alfredo Galán, Spanish serial killer 
 Álvaro Galán Floria, boccia player from Spain
 Ana Galán, Spanish writer
 Augie Galan, American baseball player
 Borja Galán (born 1993), Spanish footballer 
 Cachita Galán (1943–2004), Argentine singer
 Carlos F. Galán, Spanish-born lieutenant for the Mexican Army, lawyer, founder of La Baja California
 Carlos Walter Galán Barry, auxiliary bishop of Morón and archbishop of La Plata
 Cristóbal Galán, Spanish composer
 Daniel Elahi Galán (born 1996), Colombian tennis player
 Demetrio Galán Bergua, Spanish physician, humanist and journalist
 Enrique Galán, Spanish footballer
 Ernesto Galán, Spanish footballer
 Fermín Galán, Spanish soldier
 Francisco Galán, Spanish military officer
 Giancarlo Galan, Italian politician and Governor of the Veneto region
 Gilda Galán, Puerto Rican actress
 Gillian Galan, French rugby union player
 Javier "Javi" Galán Gil (born 1994), Spanish footballer 
 Jorge E. Galán, Argentine biologist
 Jorge Galán, Spanish footballer
 José Antonio Galán, Colombian historical figure
 José Ignacio Sánchez Galán, Spanish businessman
 José María Gabriel y Galán, Spanish poet
 José María Galán, Spanish military officer
 José María Garza Galán, Mexican politician
 José Galán, Spanish footballer
 Juana Galán, Spanish guerrilla fighter
 Juan Eslava Galán, Spanish writer
 Juan Manuel Galán Pachón, Colombian politician
 Julio Galán, Mexican artist
 Lucas Ramírez Galán O.F.M. (1714–1774), Spanish Roman Catholic archbishop
 Luis Carlos Galán, Colombian politician murdered in 1989
 Magda De Galan, Belgian politician
 Nely Galán, Cuban entrepreneur
 Pacho Galan, Colombian composer
 Pedro Cerezo Galán, Spanish philosopher and university professor.
 Pedro José Lorenzo Galán, Spanish footballer
 Romeo Galán, Argentine sprinter
 Sebastián Galán, Uruguayan footballer
 Tommy Galán, Dominican politician

Places
 Galán, a caldera in Catamarca Province, Argentina
 Galan, Hautes-Pyrénées, a commune of the Hautes-Pyrénées département, in southwestern France
 Galán, Santander a municipality and town in Colombia
 Galan, Kurdistan, a village in Kurdistan Province, Iran
 Galan, Mazandaran, a village in Mazandaran Province, Iran
 Garza Galán, a city in Coahuila, Mexican
 Kelileh Galan, a village in Kurdistan Province, Iran
 Sar Galan, Razavi Khorasan, Iran

Other uses
 Galan (grape), an alternative name of the Bulgarian wine grape Dimiat
 Arthur Galan AG, a fashion brand
 Luis Carlos Galán Velodrome, in Bogotá, Colombia
 Galactus, a cosmic entity in Marvel Comics whose name was once Galan

See also
 
 Galen (disambiguation)
 Galien (disambiguation)
 Gehlen (disambiguation)
 Nos galan (disambiguation)
 Sar Galan (disambiguation)